This is a list of Members of Parliament (MPs) elected to the House of Commons by constituencies in Northern Ireland for the Fifty-Fourth Parliament of the United Kingdom (2005 to 2010).

It includes both MPs elected at the 2005 general election, held on 5 May 2005, and those subsequently elected in by-elections.

The list is sorted by the name of the MP, and MPs who did not serve throughout the Parliament are italicised. New MPs elected since the general election are noted at the bottom of the page.

Sinn Féin MPs choose not to take up their seats in the House of Commons.

Composition

MPs

See also
 Results of the 2005 United Kingdom general election
 List of MPs elected in the 2005 United Kingdom general election
 List of MPs for English constituencies 2005-2010
 List of MPs for Scottish constituencies 2005–2010
 List of MPs for Welsh constituencies 2005-2010
 List of Democratic Unionist Party MPs 2005-2010
 List of United Kingdom Labour MPs 2005-
 List of United Kingdom Labour and Labour Co-operative MPs 2005-
 List of United Kingdom Labour Co-operative MPs 2005-
 List of United Kingdom Conservative MPs 2005-
 List of United Kingdom Liberal Democrat MPs 2005-
 Members of the House of Lords
 :Category:UK MPs 2005-2010

 Northern Ireland
2005-2010
MPs
2000s elections in Northern Ireland